The Canadian Screen Award for Best Supporting Actor in a Drama Series or Program is an annual Canadian television award, presented by the Academy of Canadian Cinema and Television to the best supporting performance by an actor in a Canadian dramatic television series or television film. Previously presented as part of the Gemini Awards, since 2013 it has been presented as part of the Canadian Screen Awards.

Originally, only a single award for supporting actor was presented, without regard to the distinction between series, miniseries or television films. At the 10th Gemini Awards in 1995, separate awards were instituted for supporting actor in a continuing television series and supporting actor in a television film or miniseries; the separate awards were presented until the Gemini Awards were merged into the Canadian Screen Awards, and since the 1st Canadian Screen Awards in 2012 there has again only been a single category presented for all three types of content.

In August 2022, the Academy announced that beginning with the 11th Canadian Screen Awards in 2023, a gender-neutral award for Best Supporting Performance in a Drama Program or Series will be presented.

1980s

1990s

2000s

2010s

2020s

References

Best Supporting Actor, Drama